Vithalrao Ganpatrao Hande  is an Indian politician. He was elected to the Lok Sabha, the lower house of the Parliament of India as a member of the Peasants and Workers Party of India.

References

External links
Official biographical sketch in Parliament of India website

Lok Sabha members from Maharashtra
1922 births
India MPs 1977–1979